Industreet is a Nigerian TV drama and entertainment series that premiered on May 26, 2017, written by JJC Skillz and produced by Funke Akindele Bello. The project is focused on the African music and entertainment industry, and showcased the lifestyle, experiences and challenges encountered by newcomers in the Nigerian music industry before growing into stardom. It is music, movie and media oriented, explaining the Ghetto lifestyle experience.

Produced by Scene One Production, it premiered at IMAX Cinema, Lekki and has been on TV screens.

Cast 
 Funke Akindele
 Linda Ejiofor
 Lydia Forson
Pearl Agwu
Rubee Agwu
 Leo Ugochukwu
 Daddy Freeze
 Aderounmu Adejumoke
 Kay Switch
 Charles Okocha
 DO2dTUN
 Dayoslides
 Kalidobaby
 Martinzfeelz
Tobi Makinde
Tomike Adeoye
 Funso Adeolu

Guests
 Niniola
 Ushbebe
 Swishkicks
 Gemstones
 Mo Eazy
Sonorous

References 

Nigerian drama television series
2017 Nigerian television series debuts